Karimabad-e Suis (also Romanized as Karīmābād-e Sūīs; also known as Karīmābād-e Moţlaq) is a village in Darbqazi Rural District, in the Central District of Nishapur County, Razavi Khorasan Province, Iran. At the 2006 census, its population was 19, in 4 families.

References 

Populated places in Nishapur County